Serbia debuted in the Eurovision Song Contest 2007 with the song "Molitva" written by Saša Milošević Mare and Vladimir Graić. The song was performed by Marija Šerifović. The Serbian national broadcaster, Radio Television of Serbia (RTS) organised the national final Beovizija 2007 in order to select the Serbian entry for the 2007 contest in Helsinki, Finland. The national final consisted of two shows: a semi-final and a final on 7 and 8 March 2007, respectively. Twenty entries competed in the semi-final where the top ten qualified to the final following the combination of votes from a three-member jury panel and a public televote. The ten qualifiers competed in the final which resulted in "Molitva" performed by Marija Šerifović as the winner following the combination of votes from a three-member jury panel and a public televote.

Serbia competed in the semi-final of the Eurovision Song Contest which took place on 10 May 2007. Performing during the show in position 15, "Molitva" was announced among the top 10 entries of the semi-final and therefore qualified to compete in the final on 12 May. It was later revealed that Serbia placed first out of the 28 participating countries in the semi-final with 298 points. In the final, Serbia performed in position 17 and placed first out of the 24 participating countries, winning the contest and scoring 268 points. This was Serbia's first win in the Eurovision Song Contest.

Background 

On 28 December 2006, the Serbian national broadcaster, Radio Television of Serbia (RTS), confirmed their intentions to debut at the 2007 Eurovision Song Contest for the first time as an independent nation following the dissolution of the State Union of Serbia and Montenegro, having previously competed from 1961 to 1992 as part of Yugoslavia and in 2004 and 2005 as part of Serbia and Montenegro. RTS would also broadcast the event within Serbia and organise the selection process for the nation's entry. Since 2004, Serbia used the Beovizija national final in order to select their entries for the Serbian and Montenegrin national final Evropesma/Europjesma and along with their participation confirmation, the broadcaster announced the organization of Beovizija 2007 in order to select the 2007 Serbian entry.

Before Eurovision

Beovizija 2007
Beovizija 2007 was the fifth edition of the Beovizija national final organised by RTS in order to select the Serbian entry for the Eurovision Song Contest 2007. The selection consisted of a semi-final featuring twenty songs and a final featuring ten songs to be held on 7 and 8 March 2007, respectively, at the Sava Centar in Belgrade. Both shows were hosted by Jelena Jovičić and Boda Ninković. The two shows were broadcast on RTS1, RTS Sat, in Bosnia and Herzegovina on RTRS, via radio on Radio Belgrade as well as streamed online via the broadcaster's website rts.co.yu.

Competing entries 
Artists and songwriters were able to submit their entries between 28 December 2006 and 29 January 2007. Artists were required to be Serb citizens and submit entries in Serbian, while songwriters of any nationality were allowed to submit songs. At the closing of the deadline, 200 submissions were received. A selection committee reviewed the submissions and selected twenty entries to proceed to the national final. The selection committee consisted of RTS music editors Anja Rogljić, Ana Miličević, Zoran Dašić, Jelena Ilić, Nikola Dojčinović, Miki Stanojević and Bilja Krstić. The selected competing entries were announced on 7 February 2007.

Semi-final 
The semi-final took place on 7 March 2007 where twenty songs competed. The ten qualifiers for the final were decided by a combination of votes from a jury panel consisting of Branimir Dimitrijević (television director), Aleksandar Lokner (composer) and Maja Japundža-Nikolić (television host), and the Serbian public via SMS voting. The duo Flamingosi were featured as the guest performer during the show.

Final 
The final took place on 8 March 2007 and featured the ten qualifiers from the preceding semi-final. The winner, "Molitva" performed by Marija Šerifović, was decided by a combination of votes from a jury panel consisting of Sandra Šuša (RTS entertainment editor-in-chief), Zafir Hadžimanov (singer-songwriter and actor) and Dragana Šarić (represented Yugoslavia in the Eurovision Song Contest 1991 as Bebi Dol), and the Serbian public via SMS voting. Eurovision contestants Marija Šestić, Dado Topić and Dragonfly, Karolina Gočeva, Stevan Faddy and Alenka Gotar, which would represent Bosnia and Herzegovina, Croatia, Macedonia, Montenegro and Slovenia in 2007, respectively, singer Bilja Krstić, and the band Zana were featured as guest performers during the show.

At Eurovision 
According to Eurovision rules, all nations with the exceptions of the host country, the "Big Four" (France, Germany, Spain and the United Kingdom) and the ten highest placed finishers in the 2006 contest are required to qualify from the semi-final on 10 May 2007 in order to compete for the final on 12 May 2007; the top ten countries from the semi-final progress to the final. On 12 March 2007, a special allocation draw was held which determined the running order for the semi-final and Serbia was set to perform in position 15, following the entry from Poland and before the entry from Czech Republic.

The semi-final and the final were broadcast in Serbia on RTS1 and RTS Sat with commentary by Duška Vučinić-Lučić. The Serbian spokesperson, who announced the Serbian votes during the final, was Maja Japundža-Nikolić.

Semi-final 

Marija Šerifović took part in technical rehearsals on 4 and 6 May, followed by dress rehearsals on 9 and 10 May. The Serbian performance featured Marija Šerifović performing in a white and black shirt with black trousers together with five backing vocalists in black costumes. The performance began with the backing vocalists at the back of the stage turned away from the audience with Šerifović at the centre stage. The backing vocalists gradually joined Šerifović, holding hands and ultimately placing their hands on Šerifović. The stage lighting and background LED screens predominately displayed red colours and a burning sun. The five backing vocalists that joined Marija Šerifović on stage were: Ksenija Milošević, Sanja Bogosavljević, Suzana Dinić, Ivana Selakov and Ana Milenković.

At the end of the show, Serbia was announced as having finished in the top 10 and subsequently qualifying for the grand final. It was later revealed that Serbia placed first in the semi-final, receiving a total of 298 points.

Final 
The draw for the running order for the final was done by the presenters during the announcement of the ten qualifying countries during the semi-final and Serbia was drawn to perform in position 17, following the entry from Germany and before the entry from Ukraine. Marija Šerifović once again took part in dress rehearsals on 11 and 12 May before the final and Šerifović performed a repeat of her semi-final performance during the final on 12 May. Serbia won the contest placing first with a score of 268 points. This was Serbia's first victory in the Eurovision Song Contest, making Serbia the second country to win with a debut entry after Switzerland's win at the inaugural edition in 1956.

Voting 
Below is a breakdown of points awarded to Serbia and awarded by Serbia in the semi-final and grand final of the contest. The nation awarded its 12 points to Hungary in the semi-final and the final of the contest.

Points awarded to Serbia

Points awarded by Serbia

References

2007
Countries in the Eurovision Song Contest 2007
Eurovision